The Edward C. Waller Apartments are located from 2840 to 2858 W. Walnut Street in Chicago, Illinois. They were designed by Frank Lloyd Wright and built in 1895 and named after Edward C. Waller, a prominent Chicago developer after the 1871 fire. Waller and Wright collaborated on the Waller apartments and the Francisco Terrace apartments to execute Waller's pioneering idea of subsidizing lower income housing. Each apartment was designed with a parlor, chamber (bedroom), dining room, kitchen, bathroom, and closets.

Some of the oldest buildings to be used for subsidized housing in Chicago, they received Chicago Landmark status on March 2, 1994.

Notes

References
 Storrer, William Allin. The Frank Lloyd Wright Companion. University Of Chicago Press, 2006,  (S.031)

Chicago Landmarks
Residential buildings completed in 1895
Frank Lloyd Wright buildings
Buildings and structures in Chicago
Apartment buildings in Chicago